Jazz and the Sound of Nature is an album by multi-instrumentalist Yusef Lateef recorded in 1957 and released on the Savoy label.

Reception 

The Allmusic site awarded the album 4½ stars.

Track listing 
All compositions by Yusef Lateef except as indicated
 "Seulb" (Wilbur Harden) - 6:13
 "Song of Delilah" (Ray Evans, Jay Livingston, Victor Young) - 8:21
 "Sounds of Nature" - 3:47
 "I Got It Bad (and That Ain't Good)" (Duke Ellington, Paul Francis Webster) - 6:19
 "8540 Twelfth Street" - 4:25
 "Check Blues" - 6:40
 "Gypsy Arab" (Harden) - 3:26

Personnel 
Yusef Lateef - tenor saxophone, flute - track 2, tambourine, Indian reed whistle
Wilbur Harden - flugelhorn, tambourine
Hugh Lawson - piano, ocarina
Ernie Farrow - bass, rebab
Oliver Jackson - drums, gong

References 

Yusef Lateef albums
1958 albums
Albums produced by Ozzie Cadena
Albums recorded at Van Gelder Studio
Savoy Records albums